Qarah Tappeh-ye Sabalan (also Romanized as Qarah Tappeh-ye Sabalān; also known as Qarah Tappeh) is a village in Sardabeh Rural District, in the Central District of Ardabil County, Ardabil Province, Iran. At the 2006 census, its population was 877, in 174 families.

References 

Towns and villages in Ardabil County